Alexander Ilyich Gitovich (1 March 1909 — 9 August 1966) was a Soviet Russian poet and translator of Chinese and Korean poetry (Li Bai, Du Fu, Mao Zedong and others).

Gitovich was born in Smolensk and studied at Leningrad State University. He participated to the Great Patriotic War. He died in Komarovo, Saint Petersburg, and was buried there, not far from his friend Anna Akhmatova's grave.

Works 
 Мы входим в Пишпек, 1931
 Фронтовые стихи, 1943
 Стихи военного корреспондента, 1947
 Стихи о Корее, 1950
 Под звездами Азии, 1955
 Пиры в Армении, 1968
 Мы видели Корею, 1948 (в соавторстве с Б.Бурсовым)

References

External links 
 
 Grave

1909 births
1966 deaths
People from Smolensk
Saint Petersburg State University alumni
Soviet translators
Soviet military personnel of World War II
Soviet male writers
Chinese–Russian translators
Translators from Korean